Emanuele Tovo (Turin, 19th century) was an Italian painter, mainly a prolific creator of portrait miniatures for the House of Savoy, but also of larger portraits and landscapes.

Biography 
He was born and resided in Turin. He completed portraits, in miniature on ivory, of Vittorio Emanuele II, King Umberto I, Queen Margherita, Princess Elisabetta, the Duchess of Genoa and the Prince of Naples. Other works in miniature on ivory are L' Aurora, Zefiro e Flora and Dio Pane e Ninfe, exhibited in Turin. Among his paintings are two landscapes depicting Alpine regions and another titled Una mosca ed una formica. He is likely related to the painter Petronilla Tovo .

References

19th-century Italian painters
Italian male painters
Painters from Turin
Portrait miniaturists
19th-century Italian male artists